Caleb Hopkins may refer to:
Caleb Hopkins (Upper Canada) (1785–1880), farmer and politician in Upper Canada
Caleb Hopkins (colonel) (1770–1818), War of 1812 hero, first town supervisor of Pittsford, New York